Richard Andrew Hall (17 May 1949 – 13 September 2011) was an English archaeologist who specialized in Viking activity in the British Isles.

Early life and education
Richard Andrew Hall was born in Ilford on 17 May 1949. He moved to Belfast at a young age, where he was educated at the Royal Belfast Academical Institution. 

Hall received his first degree in archaeology from Queen's University Belfast in 1971 with a dissertation on Viking activity in Ireland. His dissertation was supervised by Peter Addyman. In the 1985 he received a PhD from the University of Southampton with a dissertation on towns of the English Danelaw.

Career
Hall joined the York Archaeological Trust in 1974 as excavations supervisor. He would eventually hold the position of director of archaeology and deputy director of the trust. At the same time, Hall was a Lecturer in the Department of Continuing Education at the University of Leeds. Hall conducted pioneering research on Scandinavian York and helped create the Jorvik Viking Centre. He also conducted research at the Viking town of Skiringssal (Kaupang), Norway and suggested that the Scandinavian settlers of York might have originated from that town.

Hall was the author of numerous publications on Vikings, on which he was considered one the world's foremost experts. In his writings, he maintained that Vikings were less violent and more advanced than previously believed, and that they have played a significant role in the history of the British Isles.

Hall was a trustee of the Foundation for the Preservation of Archaeological Heritage and served on the Council of the Institute for Archaeologists, the Executive Board of the Council for British Archaeology and the Council of the Society of Antiquaries of London. He was president of the Society for Medieval Archaeology and of the Yorkshire Archaeological Society and served as Chairman of the Council of the Institute for Archaeologists from 1987 to 1989.

Marriages and children
Hall's first marriage to Linda Tollerton ended in divorce. He married ceramics expert Ailsa Mainman in 1991, with whom he had two sons.

Death
Hall died in York on 13 September 2011, aged 62.

Selected works
 The Viking  Dig, 1984
 Exploring the World of the Vikings, 2007

Notes

References

 
 
 
 

1949 births
2011 deaths
People educated at the Royal Belfast Academical Institution
Academics of the University of Leeds
Alumni of the University of Southampton
Alumni of Queen's University Belfast
English archaeologists
Fellows of the Society of Antiquaries of London
People from Ilford